Larry Edward Barnes (October 6, 1931 – May 14, 2016) was an American football player. He played with the San Francisco 49ers and Oakland Raiders. He played college football at Colorado State University.

References

1931 births
2016 deaths
American football fullbacks
Colorado State Rams football players
San Francisco 49ers players
Oakland Raiders players
Players of American football from Colorado
People from Sterling, Colorado
American Football League players